Sharonov is an impact crater in the Lunae Palus quadrangle of Mars, located at . Sharonov is situated within the outflow channel system Kasei Valles, whose flows were divided into two main branches that bracket the crater.

References

See also 
 Planetary nomenclature
 Impact crater
 List of craters on Mars

Lunae Palus quadrangle
Impact craters on Mars